The Coraopolis Bridge  is a girder bridge over the back channel of the Ohio River connecting Grand Avenue on Neville Island to Ferree Street in Coraopolis, Pennsylvania. It opened in 1995 to replace a structure of historic significance. The original Pratt/Bowstring/Pennsylvania through truss spans, designed by Theodore Cooper, were formerly the (third) Sixth Street Bridge, spanning the Allegheny River, in downtown Pittsburgh, and were built in 1892 by the Union Bridge Company. They were floated downstream by the Foundation Company in 1927 rather than being demolished when the bridge was removed to enable construction of the present (fourth) Three Sisters (Pittsburgh) Sixth Street Self-anchored suspension bridge. However, by the late 1980s, the old bridge could no longer support traffic volumes and was replaced by a newer structure.

The Sixth Street bridges
Note: Material from this section is adopted from the HAER report  on this bridge.

The through truss spans incorporated in the present Coraopolis Bridge were originally erected across the Allegheny River at Sixth Street in Pittsburgh, linking Pittsburgh with the main business thoroughfare of neighboring Allegheny City. This was the third of four bridges to serve that location, which is considered among Pittsburgh's most important river crossings. The growth of Pittsburgh was strongly influenced by its numerous waterways, and the successful linking of the city with its neighboring communities by means of bridges was a significant factor in the development of its metropolitan identity. Allegheny City was annexed by Pittsburgh in 1907, becoming the city's "North Side".

First Sixth Street Bridge
The first bridge to cross the Allegheny at Sixth Street was a six-span, flat-roofed, covered wooden bridge constructed in 1819. The design and construction of this bridge have traditionally been attributed to a Mr. Lothrop; it was presumably a Burr arch truss, like the Ninth (Hand) Street Bridge, another of Lothrop's products. Physical evidence for this assumption survived until the 1890s, when an observer reported that the skewbacks from the wooden arches remained visible in the north abutment.

Second Sixth Street Bridge
In 1860, a wire-suspension bridge, designed by John A. Roebling, replaced the decaying timber structure. This bridge was four spans long, with two  main spans, and approach spans measuring  each. The bridge was dominated by cast iron towers, each formed by four cast iron columns.

Although the Roebling bridge, with its iron superstructure, was generally believed non-flammable, it fell victim to fire on June 19, 1881. The bridge was not destroyed, but its floor system of white pine and white oak was severely damaged. John Harper, president of the Allegheny Bridge Company, which owned and operated the structure, stated that he believed the fire was the result of "sparks and perhaps flame from the stacks" of passing steamboats igniting bird nests located under the superstructure of the bridge. After heavy electric streetcars were introduced to the bridge in 1890, concern over its functional capacity grew, and in 1891 plans were begun to replace the suspension bridge with one that could better handle the steadily increasing traffic, as well as permit trolleys to cross without reducing their speed.

Third Sixth Street Bridge

The third Sixth Street Bridge was designed by the nationally significant engineer Theodore Cooper (1839–1919). This bridge has been identified as the last surviving structure entirely designed by Cooper, whose involvement extended even to such details as the bridge's handrail, lamps, and fascia.

The third Sixth Street Bridge, like most roadway river bridges in the 19th century, was privately built and operated as a toll crossing. The total cost of construction was $560,000. This cost was underwritten by the Sixth Street Bridge Company and Fidelity Title and Trust Company, successors to the Allegheny Bridge Company, which had received its charter in 1810. When the bridge was opened in 1893, the toll was set at two cents for each man, while women crossed at no charge. Beginning in the late 1890s, Allegheny County and the City of Pittsburgh undertook a systematic program of acquiring the privately owned bridges within their jurisdiction and eliminating their tolls. The Sixth Street Bridge was purchased by Allegheny County in 1911 along with nine other bridges at the combined price of $2,851,000; all ten of these bridges were subsequently declared free.

The trusses for the third Sixth Street Bridge were fabricated by the Union Bridge Company. This company had been formed in 1884 by the merging of the Central Bridge Company of Buffalo, New York, and Kellogg and Maurice of Athens, Pennsylvania. The Buffalo plant was closed around 1890, so presumably the trusses were produced in the shops which remained at Athens.

The superstructure was erected by the Baird Brothers, John and William, who first advertised in the Pittsburgh and Allegheny City Directory in 1886 as contractors located at Home and Valley Streets. In the 1891 and 1892 editions of the Directory they were listed as bridge builders; their listings no longer appeared by 1900, and by 1911 William Baird had left the construction business and had begun managing a hotel.

The Baird Brothers had been involved with numerous bridge projects and companies in the late nineteenth century. William Baird had worked on seven bridges crossing the Missouri River, the Merchants Bridge across the Mississippi River at St. Louis, two bridges crossing the Ohio River at Wheeling, West Virginia, the bridge carrying the Baltimore & Ohio Railroad across the Susquehanna River, and bridges at Steubenville, Ohio, and Poughkeepsie, New York. John Baird had also been involved in the construction of the Eads Bridge in St. Louis and the Cairo bridge in Memphis, and had been employed by the McCann Construction Company, the Keystone Bridge Company and American Bridge Company.

This bridge was also outgrown.

While the Pittsburgh City Council and the Municipal Affairs Committee of the Pittsburgh Chamber of Commerce argued for the retention and upgrading of the existing bridges, the issue was ultimately decided by the Department of War, acting under the authority of Section 18 of the Rivers and Harbors Act of March 3, 1890 (30 Stat., 1121–1153). This act empowered the Secretary of War to require the removal or alteration of any bridge which " ... is an unreasonable obstruction to the free navigation . . . on account of insufficient height, width of span, or otherwise". So, unfortunately, the War Department decreed that the numerous bridges over the Allegheny with their differing spacing of piers, main spans, and generally low clearances, were an impediment to navigation, and decreed that all bridges would have to be replaced. Although the decree was discussed in the early 1900s, and first issued in 1917, serious work did not begin till 1924. As part of the Three Sisters (Pittsburgh) project, the bridges at Sixth, Seventh, and Ninth Streets were to be demolished and replaced. The other two bridges were destroyed and scrapped, but the Cooper Bowstring trusses were moved to Coraopolis and reused.

Moving the Sixth Street Bridge to Coraopolis
Note: The material in this section is taken from a different HAER report.

The 1892 Sixth Street Bridge (as described above, a pair of camelback Pratt trusses and the third bridge built in this location) had a second chance. In 1927, it was lowered from its piers, the top chords partially disassembled. The structure was floated downriver to a new location over the Ohio River back channel between Coraopolis and Neville Island to make way for the current Sixth Street Bridge structure.

A forced opportunity
The Cooper spans remained in good shape, and concerns for economizing in public works projects led to recycling of the 1892 bridge. Commissioner Armstrong took credit for proposing to reuse the Cooper bridge instead of building an entirely new structure in nearby Coraopolis, saving Allegheny County $350,000. The Foundation Company bid on a contract to move the Sixth Street Bridge from its site in downtown Pittsburgh to Coraopolis, twelve miles away. Winning the contract at a bid of $316,200, the company also assumed any risk that the spans would sink or be damaged during the project. The company allowed pedestrians to cross the structure while roadway removal proceeded in the fall of 1926 in order to reduce the inconvenience for residents. Workers took off half of the roadway at a time, leaving pedestrian areas accessible until final segments were taken away

Removal process
The bowstring trusses, in addition to weighing 1,600 tons each, presented the difficult problem of being slightly too tall to fit under two bridges along the journey.

Each truss consisted of sixteen eye-bar panels pinned together. Removing one part would break the structure's rigidity and make moving it very difficult. Instead of shifting the spans off piers for lowering or pivoting them from their present support, the Foundation Company lowered the structure in position, taking off the masonry and using substitute supports for resting the structure without getting in the way of the process. The contractor attached a frame to each of the piers and abutments, used straps to bind the trusses to each frame, and lowered them using the straps.

With twenty-six  holes punched in the strap, the company used a matching chain to counter the eight straps. Using pins to move the strap by hole sets, the company brought the spans downward  at a time with jacks. The pins attached to the plungers of eight 500-ton jacks. The jacks remained in place while the pins moved .

Transport
Stringers supported the bridge in forty-two places, with a 40-ton screw jack at each stringer for easier loading and unloading. After supporting the bridge under the floor beams, they disassembled the top chord and stabilized each panel point on the trusses. Steering the bridge under the Manchester Bridge and the railroad bridge at Brunot's Island, the tugboat captains went through the Ohio River lock and up the back channel toward Coraopolis, where piers and abutments had been constructed.

Reassembly
Reversing the process and using the same jacks and steel frames to raise the structure , the company erected the Cooper bridge 30 days after the project began.

The Farris Engineering Company, a Pittsburgh company located in the Empire Building, performed a great deal of work on the bridge at its new location. The original approved contract for their work had a price total of $271,811.50. They built portions of the substructure that the Foundation Company had not done. Farris also erected the two pony truss approach spans, repaired and painted the main superstructure, and paved the bridge deck and the two approaches.

The approach spans, and the end bearings for the main spans, were fabricated by the American Bridge Company at its shops located in Ambridge, Pennsylvania.

End of life
Allegheny County ended up replacing the Coraopolis Bridge with a new bridge at this location. By the 1980s, due to its deteriorated condition and inadequate load carrying capacity, the four span truss bridge did not meet the transportation needs of its location.

After nearly 50 years of additional service, which included weight restrictions and closings during cold weather (for a time it was restricted to carrying vehicles with a maximum weight of three tons, and it was only open to vehicular traffic during periods when the temperature is above 30 degrees Fahrenheit), the old bridge was replaced by a deck girder bridge which was completed in 1995.

Thus, eventually it was closed, demolished, and replaced, ending a unique chapter in American bridge history.

Current bridge at location
The current Coraopolis-Neville Island Bridge at this location (OB02) was built in 1994 and completed in 1995. This steel deck girder bridge spans the back channel of the Ohio River between Coraopolis, Pennsylvania, and Neville Township, Pennsylvania.

See also
List of bridges documented by the Historic American Engineering Record in Pennsylvania
Three Sisters Bridges

Notes
 The town Coraopolis (and therefore the bridge) are sometimes referred to as Corapolis, that is, missing the 'O' between the 'A' and 'P', which can make searches somewhat difficult. For example, the HAER material is indexed this way although the HAER article text uses the spelling with the 'O'.
 The trusses are conflictingly referred to in different sources as "Bowstring", "Pennsylvania" or "Pratt". Pratt is the most common name. Bowstring may refer to the shape of the bridge, it has some resemblance to a bow, with the roadway as the string (in this particular truss design instance, the members at the road level are eyebar, as can be seen in the belowdeck illustration, above, and thus are in tension only, which also may be why it's named that way) This tension only, pin joint construction is the major factor making the move difficult.
 The HAER (Historic American Engineering Record) report gives an extensive history of the various bridges at the 6th street site, and of this bridge once moved. It is available in .tif form at external link #4, but Bruce S. Cridlebaugh of pghbridges.com has already scanned the text in. This text is available at external link #5.
 The HAER (Historic American Engineering Record) report gives an extensive history of the various bridges at the 6th, 7th and 9th street sites, and some info on this bridge once moved. It is available in .tif form at external link #6, but Bruce S. Cridlebaugh of pghbridges.com has already scanned the text in. This text is available at external link #7.
 This image shows the removal and barge loading process. This image (both from the pghbridges.com site) shows a truss loaded on the barge and being moved. The top chord has been disassembled to allow clearance of some bridges it must pass under.

References

External links

Historic American Engineering Record (HAER) No. PA-217, "Coraopolis Bridge"
Image at HAER.
report HAER "Corapolis Bridge, Spanning Ohio River back channel at Ferree Street & Grand Avenue, Corapolis, Allegheny County, PA" 21 pages
Text of 21 page HAER writeup at pghbridges.com (this text is in the public domain since it is taken from the Library of Congress HAER report).
report HAER "Three Sisters Bridges, Spanning Allegheny River at Sixth, Seventh & Ninth Streets, Pittsburgh, Allegheny County, PA" 43 pages.
Text of 43 page HAER writeup at pghbridges.com (this text is in the public domain since it is taken from the Library of Congress HAER report).
article at pghbridges.com
Google Maps Composite image zoomed in, showing replacement bridge.

Bridges completed in 1892
Bridges completed in 1927
Girder bridges in the United States
Road bridges on the National Register of Historic Places in Pennsylvania
Railroad bridges on the National Register of Historic Places in Pennsylvania
Bridges over the Ohio River
Road-rail bridges in the United States
Bridges in Allegheny County, Pennsylvania
Former toll bridges in Pennsylvania
National Register of Historic Places in Allegheny County, Pennsylvania
Steel bridges in the United States
Tied arch bridges in the United States
Pratt truss bridges in the United States